In Sufism, a rabbani ('Godly person'), or ribbi, is a wasil who is attached to Allah.

Presentation
The term rabbani or ribbi is cited in the Quran into several Āyates, as:

 Surate Al Imran, Āyah: 79.

 Surate Al Imran, Āyah: 146.

 Surate Al-Ma'idah, Āyah: 44.

 Surate Al-Ma'idah, Āyah: 63.

Characteristics
The rabbani has several characteristics mentioned by the Quran, as:
 Learning the Book in Warsh recitation.
 Studying the Book and other sciences.
 Supporting the Religion.
 Sabr when facing .
 Application of the jurisprudence.
 Preserving the authenticity of the Book of Allah.
 Revealing and witnessing the religion.
 Forbidding sinful speech.
 Forbidding consuming illicit gains.

See also
Islamic holy books
Talibe
Murid
Salik
Wasil
Siddiq

References

Arabic words and phrases
Sufism
Language and mysticism
Islamic belief and doctrine
Islamic terminology